Ben Lomond is a ghost town in Issaquena County, Mississippi, United States.

The community originated as a Mississippi River port on the Ben Lomond Plantation, owned by George M. Brown. A gin-house was located near the town.

Ben Lomond had a landing for steamboats and a post office. It was located across the river from Lake Providence, Louisiana.

Ben Lomond had a population of 26 in 1900.

A post office operated under the name Ben Lomond from 1879 to 1913.

The former community is today submerged in the Mississippi River.

References

Former populated places in Issaquena County, Mississippi
Mississippi populated places on the Mississippi River
Former populated places in Mississippi